John Edmund Elliot (30 March 1788 – 4 April 1862) was a British Liberal politician.

Background
Elliot was the third son of Gilbert Elliot-Murray-Kynynmound, 1st Earl of Minto, and Anna Maria, daughter of Sir George Amyand, 1st Baronet.

Political career
Elliot sat as Member of Parliament for Roxburghshire from 1837 to 1837 and again from 1847 to 1859. He served under Lord John Russell as Joint Secretary to the Board of Control between 1849 and 1852.

Family
Elliot married Amelia, daughter of James Henry Casamaijor, in 1809. They had several children. He died in April 1862, aged 74. His wife survived him by ten years and died in July 1872.

Their children were:

 Edmund James (b. 1813, d. 1854) was married to Matilda Halkett in 1853.
 William Brownrigg (b. 1820, d. 1900) was married to Mary Morton in 1858.
 Amyand Powneg Charles (b. 1842, d. 1869) was married to Anna Maria Alexander in 1842.
 Augustus John (b. 1824, d. 1889) was married to Helene Lewis of Pleam in 1855.
 Amelia Jane (b. 1810, d. 1837) was married to Thomas Campbell Robertson in 1830.
 Anna Maria Elizabeth (b. 1812, d. 1883) was married to Pierce Taylor in 1865.

References

Portrait - npg ax128967; hon. john edmund elliot

External links

1788 births
1862 deaths
Younger sons of earls
Members of the Parliament of the United Kingdom for Scottish constituencies
UK MPs 1837–1841
UK MPs 1847–1852
UK MPs 1852–1857
UK MPs 1857–1859
Scottish Liberal Party MPs